Han Thae-hyok (born 20 June 1988) is a North Korean footballer who currently plays as a midfielder for Kigwancha SC.

Career statistics

International

References

External links
 

1988 births
Living people
North Korean footballers
North Korea international footballers
Association football midfielders